Lebeck is an unincorporated community in Cedar County, in the U.S. state of Missouri.

History
A post office called Lebeck was established in 1871, and remained in operation until 1907. The community has the name of the local Lebeck family.

References

Unincorporated communities in Cedar County, Missouri
Unincorporated communities in Missouri